Andrea Martin (born 23 April 1967 in Erbach im Odenwald, Germany) is a West Germany sprint canoer who competed in the late 1980s. At the 1988 Summer Olympics in Seoul, she finished fifth in the K-4 500 m event while being eliminated in the semifinals of the K-2 500 m event.

References
 Sports-reference.com profile

1967 births
Canoeists at the 1988 Summer Olympics
West German female canoeists
Living people
Olympic canoeists of West Germany
People from Erbach im Odenwald
Sportspeople from Darmstadt (region)